Kawempe General Hospital, also known as Kawempe Specialised National Referral Hospital, is a hospital in Uganda. It is an urban, specialised hospital built between 2014 and 2016 at an estimated cost of US$11.3 million (about UGX:40.6 billion). The hospital was constructed by the government of Uganda, with funding from the African Development Bank and the Nigeria Trust Fund.

Location
The hospital is in Kawempe Division, one of the five administrative units of the Kampala Capital City Authority.
The coordinates of the hospital are 0°21'43.0"N, 32°33'41.0"E (Latitude:0.361944; Longitude:32.561389).

Overview

In December 2013, the Uganda government, through the Ministry of Health, contracted China National Aero Technology to construct the hospital at an estimated cost of US$15 million (UGX:38 billion). Construction was expected to commence in 2014. In December 2015, Ugandan print media reported that construction of the hospital was nearing completion, with commissioning planned for March 2016.

Target population
Because of rapid urbanization, the night-time population of Kampala, Uganda's capital and largest city, is estimated at 2 million, but swells to 4.5 million during the day. The increases in the city's population has exerted extreme pressure on the Mulago National Referral Hospital, the largest public hospital in the country, which also serves as the teaching hospital for the Makerere University College of Health Sciences.

In 2013, the Uganda government obtained a loan from the African Development Bank and the Nigeria Trust Fund to rehabilitate and improve Mulago Hospital, construct Kawempe General Referral Hospital, construct Kiruddu General Hospital, and re-organize healthcare delivery in the city of Kampala, so that some of the patient burden is shifted to the Naguru General Hospital, Kawempe General Hospital, and Kiruddu General Hospital. Mulago will then be reserved for the role for which it was constructed; as a true referral hospital, serving patients referred to it by other health facilities, and not handing common colds and uncomplicated ear infections.

Management
In August 2018, the Uganda Ministry of Health, appointed Dr. Nehemiah Katusiime as the executive director of the hospital, to be deputized by Dr. Lawrence Kazibwe. Both are consultant obstetricians and gynecologists.

See also
List of hospitals in Uganda
Naguru General Hospital

References

External links
  Mulago Hospital To Close for Repairs

Hospitals in Kampala
Hospitals established in 2016
2016 establishments in Uganda
Hospital buildings completed in 2016